The National Union of Teachers (NUT) was a trade union for school teachers in England, Wales, the Channel Islands and the Isle of Man.  It was a member of the Trades Union Congress.  In March 2017, NUT members endorsed a proposed merger with the Association of Teachers and Lecturers to form a new union known as the National Education Union, which came into existence on 1 September 2017.  The union recruited only qualified teachers and those training to be qualified teachers into membership and on dissolution had almost 400,000 members, making it the largest teachers' union in the United Kingdom.

Campaigns
The NUT campaigned on educational issues and working conditions for its members. Among the NUT's policies in 2017 were:
 Fair pay for teachers
 Work-life balance for teachers
 Against academies
 Abolition of National Curriculum Tests (SATs)
 One union for all teachers

The NUT offered legal protection to its members. The NUT established two financial services companies for teachers, Teachers Assurance in 1877 and the Teachers Building Society in 1966.

History

The NUT was established at a meeting at King's College London on 25 June 1870 as the National Union of Elementary Teachers (NUET) to represent all school teachers in England and Wales combining a number of local teacher associations which had formed across the country following the Elementary Education Act 1870. After toying with the idea of changing the name to the National Union of English Teachers, the name National Union of Teachers (NUT) was finally adopted at Annual Conference in April 1889.

In 1919, in response to an NUT referendum approving the principle of equal pay, a ginger group, the National Association of Men Teachers (NAMT), was formed within the NUT to further the interests of male teachers. The NAMT changed its name in 1920 to the National Association of Schoolmasters (NAS) and seceded finally from the NUT in 1922. The secession came about indirectly following a decision at the NAS Conference that year to prohibit NAS members from continuing to also be members of the NUT after the 31 December 1922. The NAS is now amalgamated into the NASUWT, the second-largest teaching union in the UK.

The NUT first established its offices at 7 Adam Street, Adelphi, London WC on the appointment of the first full-time Secretary in 1873. In 1889 it moved its headquarters to Bolton House, 67/71 Russell Square, London WC. In 1915, it moved its headquarters to Hamilton House, Mabledon Place, London WC1H 9BD, where it has remained ever since, except during the Second World War, when the NUT rented Toddington Manor, Gloucestershire in order to avoid air raids.

Leadership

General Secretaries
The General Secretary was the leader of the NUT. From 1989, the General Secretary was elected by the union's membership, with each term lasting five years.

 William Lawson, 1870–1873
 Thomas Heller, 1873–1891
 James Yoxall, 1892–1924
 Frank Goldstone, 1924–1931
 Frederick Mander, 1931–1947
 Ronald Gould, 1947–1970
 Edward Britton, 1970–1975
 Fred Jarvis, 1975–1989
 Doug McAvoy, 1989–2004
 Steve Sinnott, 2004–2008 (died in office)
 Christine Blower, 2008–2016 (acting until May 2009)
 Kevin Courtney, 2016–2017

Deputy General Secretaries
1960s: Ernest Naisbitt
1970: Fred Jarvis
1974: Doug McAvoy
c.1989: Mary Hufford
1994: Steve Sinnott
2005: Christine Blower
2010: Kevin Courtney
2016: Post vacant

Presidents

Annual Conference
The NUT annual conference took place every spring. The timing always coincided with Easter weekend: starting on Good Friday and ending on Easter Tuesday and took place in various locations.  The last NUT Conference was held in Cardiff in 2017.  Following the NUT amalgamation with the Association of Teachers and Lecturers on 1 September 2017 there will be a National Education Union - NUT Section held in Brighton in 2018.

Fred and Anne Jarvis Award
Named after former General Secretary Fred Jarvis and his late wife, the Fred and Anne Jarvis Award was established in 2007 and was presented annually by the NUT to individuals other than NUT members who campaigned tirelessly for all children and young people.  For a list of winners of the Fred and Anne Jarvis Award see List of Fred and Anne Jarvis Award winners.

See also

 National Association of Schoolmasters Union of Women Teachers
 Association of Teachers and Lecturers
 Education in the United Kingdom

References

External links

 NUT website
 NUT YouTube channel
 NEU website
 Catalogue of the NUT archives, held at the Modern Records Centre, University of Warwick

 
1870 establishments in England
2017 disestablishments in England
Education in England
Education in Guernsey
Education in Jersey
Education in the Isle of Man
Education in Wales
Education International
Education trade unions
Organisations based in the London Borough of Camden
Teacher associations based in the United Kingdom
Trade unions established in 1870
Trade unions disestablished in 2017
Trade unions in the United Kingdom
Trade unions based in London